International Horror and Sci-Fi Film Festival is a film festival dedicated to the genres of horror and science fiction. The event is held annually in Tempe, Arizona, United States. The festival was founded in 2005 by Brian Pulido and Chris LaMont.

2006 festival awards

Hall of fame

 Mick Garris - The Stand, Masters of Horror

Sci-fi awards

 Best Science Fiction Feature - Firefly
 Best Director - Firefly
 Best Documentary - Pulp Fiction Art: Cheap Thrills and Painted Nightmares
 Best Animated Sci-Fi Feature - Robotech: The Shadow Chronicles
 Best Science Fiction Short Film - The Grandfather Paradox
 Best Science Fiction Animated Short - I Must Destroy You
 Best Alternate Reality Featurette - Assumption
 Best Surreal Short Film - Reality Check
 Best Science Fiction Musical - Alien Rose
 Best Alternate Reality Short - Outside In
 Best Science Fiction Tragedy - MICROGRAVITY
 Best Cinematography - Model Man
 Best Story in an SF Short Film - The Futurist
 Best Set Design - Adidas, Adi-color Green
 Best Surreal Future Short Film - Last Man in Brooklyn
 Best Fantasy Short Film - Say That You Love Me...

Horror awards

 Best Horror Feature - Unrest
 Best Actress - Corri English, Unrest
 Best Screenplay - In Memorium
 Best Splatter - The Slaughter
 Best Short - Penny Dreadful
 Best College Sound Design - Penny Dreadful
 Best Editing - Penny Dreadful
 Best Acting Ensemble - Death by Engagement
 Best Actress College Short - Emily Vacchiano, Penny Dreadful
 Creepiest Micro Short - No. 12
 Best Zombie Comedy - Zombies in Love
 Most Disturbing Short - Faceless
 Atomic Comics Fright Fest Award - Zomburrito
 Best Zombie Film - Recently Deceased
 Creepiest College Short - Watcher
 Best Foreign Short - Akai
 Goriest Micro Short - Deadly Tantrum
 Best Dark Future Drama - A through M
 Best Screenplay - A through M
 Best Dark Fantasy Short Film - Scribble
 Best Science Fiction Satire - Passion to the Max
 Best Dystopic Future Short Film - Bartholomew's Song
 Best Special Effects - Man vs. Woman
 Best Dark Future Foreign Film - Missing Pages
 Best Dark Future Short Film - The Salesman
 Best Superhero Short Film - Dial ‘A’ for Alphaman
 Best Accidental Apocalypse - Genesis Antipode
 Best Science Fiction Short Drama - NIA
 Best Black and White Science Fiction Short - 36
 Best Story in a Dark Future Short Film - Robots Are Blue
 Creepiest Short - Room to Breathe
 Micro Short Hall of Fame - Ghost Busted
 Best Micro-Short Cinematography - The Cobbler's Daughter
 Best Adaptation - Pit and the Pendulum
 Most Promising Filmmaker - Schattenkind
 Best Comedy/Horror, Micro Short - Movie Monster Insurance
 Best Documentary - Horror Fans
 Best Micro Short Zombie Film - Cannibal Grave Yard
 Best Sound Design, Foreign Short - Bad Dreams
 Creative Vision Award - Siniestro
 Goriest Short - Terrorist Ate My Brain
 Best Comedy/Horror - Zombie American
 Best Animated Short - If I Had a Hammer
 Best Cinematography, Foreign Short - Devilwood
 Best Costumes, Foreign Short - Devilwood
 Best High School Short - Snowmaniac
 Best Actress Horror Short - Lea Moreno, The Need
 IHSFF Alumni Award, Best Returning Filmmaker - The Resurrectionist
 Best Music - The Resurrectionist
 Best Short Screenplay - The Resurrectionist
 Best Short Cinematography - The Listening Dead
 Best Effects - The Listening Dead
 Best Production Design - The Listening Dead

2005 festival awards

Hall of fame
 Tobe Hooper - The Texas Chain Saw Massacre, Poltergeist
 Lloyd Kaufman - The Toxic Avenger, Tromeo and Juliet

See also
 Brussels International Festival of Fantasy Film
 Dead by Dawn
 European Fantastic Film Festivals Federation
 Fantafestival
 Fantasia Festival
 Festival de Cine de Sitges
 Fantastic Fest
 New York City Horror Film Festival
 Toronto After Dark Film Festival
 TromaDance
 South African Horrorfest
 Nightmares Film Festival

References

External links 

Film festivals in Arizona
Film festivals established in 2005
Fantasy and horror film festivals in the United States
Science fiction film festivals
Tempe, Arizona
Events in Maricopa County, Arizona